Kuntsawshchyna is a Minsk Metro station. It was opened on 7 November 2005.

Minsk Metro stations
Railway stations opened in 2005